Þingeyrakirkja is an Icelandic church  situated between lakes Hóp and Húnavatn at Þingeyrar in Iceland's Northwestern Region.

It was consecrated on 9 Sept. 1877 by the Reverend Eiríkur Briem from Steinnes.  Þingeyrakirkja is  a stone church which replaced an old turf church, the objects from which were moved to  Þingeyrakirkja . Among the valuable items are an alabastar altarpiece most likely dating from the 13th century, and a pulpit estimated to be of Dutch origin from the year 1696. The pulpit was a gift from Lárus Gottrúp, a lawyer who resided at Þingeyrar Monastery (Þingeyraklaustur) from 1683 to 1721. He also gave a silver baptismal font inscribed with the dates 1663 and 1697. A silver chalice and an altar linen from 1763 are also among the church's historically valuable possessions.

Ásgeir Einarsson (1809–1885) was largely responsible for the church's construction. Einarsson  was a local farmer and a member of Icelandic Parliament ( Alþingi). Construction of the church took 13 years and required transporting stone from Nesbjörg throughout the winter of 1864–65, by sled over the ice-covered lake Hóp on an 8-km journey. Stonemason Sverrir Runólfsson assisted with the planning and built the church walls. Each stone used was put in stowage or tied down and also glued with chalk, and the stones have not moved to this day.

References

External links
Official Website

Churches in Iceland
Buildings and structures in Northwestern Region (Iceland)